The Rhyparochromidae are a large family of true bugs (order Hemiptera), many of which are commonly referred to as seed bugs. The family includes two subfamilies, more than 420 genera, and over 2,100 described species.

Rhyparochromidae are small and generally brown or mottled. The fore femora are often enlarged.

The name Rhyparochromidae comes from the Greek words rhyparos, meaning "dirt", and chromus, meaning "color".

The Rhyparochromidae were previously classified as a subfamily of Lygaeidae.

Subfamilies and Tribes 
The family Rhyparochromidae has two subfamilies, Plinthisinae with only 2 genera, and Rhyparochrominae with more than 400 genera in 14 tribes:

 Antillocorini
 Cleradini
 Drymini
 Gonianotini
 Lethaeini
 Lilliputocorini
 Megalonotini
 Myodochini
 Ozophorini
 Phasmosomini
 Rhyparochromini
 Stygnocorini
 Targaremini
 Udeocorini

See also
 List of Rhyparochrominae genera

References

External links

 

 
Heteroptera families
Lygaeoidea